WithU Volley Verona is a professional volleyball team based in Verona, Italy. The club plays in Serie A1 of the Italian Volleyball League.

History
The company API Volleyball Verona Ltd. was founded in June 2001 when two prominent volleyball companies in Verona, API Volleyball and Volleyball Verona Isola della Scala, merged. The then club team Volleyball Verona that played in Serie B1 won the championship and received promotion to Serie A2. The following season 2002, the team played with a new name AESSSE VRB Verona. They finished 3rd in the regular season.

In 2003 the club received a short noticed offer to play in Serie A1 when Volley Parma withdrew from the competition. The club accepted the offer despite having little time to prepare. This was the club's appearance debut in Serie A1. The club was then relegated back to A2 for the next season.

In 2004 the club went on to win the A2 championship without defeats. They were promoted again to A1. They also secured a five-year sponsorship with company MARMI LANZA. The team's performance were positive in the next two seasons. The team were relegated to A2 in 2007 but quickly regained promotion to play in A1 for the 2008 season. Since then the team has been playing in Serie A1. The club changed its name in 2014 to Calzedonia Verona when Calzedonia Group acquired the title sponsorship rights.

With the change of sponsor, the club used WithU Volley Verona for Season 2022-2023.

Team
Team roster – season 2022/2023

Former names
 Calzedonia Verona 2017/2018
 Blu Volley Verona

Achievements
 CEV Challenge Cup
  2016
 Italian Championship Serie A2
  2004
  2008
 Italian Cup Serie A2
  2004, 2008

Kit manufacturer
The table below shows the history of kit providers for the Verona team.

Sponsorship
Primary sponsors include: main sponsors like Calzedonia other sponsors: Petas, UnipolSai, Corsini Cancelleria, AGSM Verona, La Fortezza, Enoteca zero7, STAServizi and 30 different companies.

References

External links
 Official website
 LegaVolley squad
 Team profile at Volleybox.net

Italian volleyball clubs